Boone Township is the name of six townships in the U.S. state of Indiana:

 Boone Township, Cass County, Indiana
 Boone Township, Crawford County, Indiana
 Boone Township, Dubois County, Indiana
 Boone Township, Harrison County, Indiana
 Boone Township, Madison County, Indiana
 Boone Township, Porter County, Indiana

See also
 Boone Township (disambiguation)

Indiana township disambiguation pages